Brighton Mugochi (born 23 July 1988) is a Zimbabwean cricketer. He made his first-class debut for Centrals cricket team in the 2006–07 Logan Cup on 12 April 2007.

References

External links
 

1988 births
Living people
Zimbabwean cricketers
Centrals cricketers
Mid West Rhinos cricketers
Sportspeople from Harare